The BMW F800ST is a sport touring motorcycle, made by BMW Motorrad from 2006 to 2013.  Along with the closely related BMW F800S, other bikes in the F-bike range are the dual-sport F800GS, and the naked F800R. It has the same frame, engine, and suspension as the F800S, but differs primarily in fairing design and handlebar type.   
In 2013 it was replaced by the F800GT.

BMW developed with Rotax a  parallel-twin engine with a 360 degree firing order. This produced an exhaust note reminiscent of BMW's signature air-cooled boxer twins. However, this firing order required both pistons to move up and down at the same time. To counter the significant inertia produced by the pistons reciprocating, BMW devised a third vestigial connecting rod to a balance weight. The result was a parallel twin with significantly reduced vibration compared with other parallel twin engine designs. The engine is oiled by a dry sump system, and a soft ignition-cut rev limiter engaged at 9,000 rpm. 
BMW tuned the F800 series engine to run lean, typically with air-fuel ratios in the range of 15:1 to 16:1.

The F800ST has a low-maintenance belt drive and single sided swingarm. Bikes equipped with ABS also include a rear-wheel lift detection system. Other options include LED signals, a lower seat, an alarm system, heated handlebar grips, a tire pressure monitoring system and an on-board computer system.

References

External links

F800ST
Motorcycles introduced in 2006
Sport bikes
Sport touring motorcycles
Motorcycles powered by straight-twin engines